Wanted Man, or A Wanted Man or The Wanted Man may refer to:

Books
A Wanted Man a Lee Child novel
A Most Wanted Man, a John Le Carre novel

Film and television
A Most Wanted Man (film), film based on the John Le Carre novel
Wanted Man, TV episode 2014 Longmire (TV series)
Wanted Man, TV episode 2007  Burn Notice
The Wanted Man, TV episode 1962   Lawman (TV series)
"Wanted Man" (Burn Notice), an episode of the USA Network television show Burn Notice

Music

Albums
Wanted Man (Johnny Cash album), a 1994 Johnny Cash album
Wanted Man (Paul Kelly album), a 1994 Paul Kelly album

Songs
"Wanted Man", a song recorded by Frankie Laine in 1960
"Wanted Man" (Johnny Cash song)
"Wanted Man" (Ratt song)